River Muick is a river of the Grampian Mountains of Aberdeenshire, Scotland.

The river is described as meandering "tightly across the wide valley floor, filled with glacial deposit which has been partly worked flat by the river".

The river is inhabited by salmon. In the mid 19th century specimens of Melampyrum sylvaticum and Hieracium boreale were collected along the banks.

References

Muick